Year 189 (CLXXXIX) was a common year starting on Wednesday (link will display the full calendar) of the Julian calendar. At the time, it was known as the Year of the Consulship of Silanus and Silanus (or, less frequently, year 942 Ab urbe condita). The denomination 189 for this year has been used since the early medieval period, when the Anno Domini calendar era became the prevalent method in Europe for naming years.

Events 
 By place 

 Roman Empire 
 Plague (possibly smallpox) kills as many as 2,000 people per day in Rome. Farmers are unable to harvest their crops, and food shortages bring riots in the city.

 China 
 Liu Bian succeeds Emperor Ling, as Chinese emperor of the Han Dynasty.
 Dong Zhuo has Liu Bian deposed, and installs Emperor Xian as emperor.
 Two thousand eunuchs in the palace are slaughtered in a violent purge in Luoyang, the capital of Han.

 By topic 

 Arts and sciences 
 Galen publishes his "Treatise on the various temperaments" (aka On the Elements According to Hippocrates).

 Religion 
 Pope Victor I succeeds Pope Eleuterus as the fourteenth pope, the first from Africa.
 Demetrius of Alexandria becomes Patriarch of Alexandria.
 Pantaenus, who was sent by the bishop of Alexandria to India to preach Christianity, meets with little success.

Births 
 March 7 – Publius Septimius Geta, Roman emperor (d. 211)
 Ling Tong, Chinese general of the Eastern Wu state (d. 217)
 Zhang Chunhua, Chinese noblewoman and aristocrat (d. 247)

Deaths 
 May 13 – Ling of Han (or Liu Hong), Chinese emperor (b. 156)
 May 24 – Eleutherius, bishop of Rome (or Catholic Church)
 September 22 – He Jin, Chinese Grand Marshal and regent
 Ding Yuan (or Jian Yang), Chinese official and warlord 
 Jian Shuo, Chinese eunuch leader (Ten Attendants)
 Lingsi (or He), Chinese empress of the Han Dynasty
 Xiaoren, Chinese empress dowager of the Han Dynasty

References